Andrzej Rafałowicz (1736-1823) was a Polish merchant, banker and politician. He served as President of Warsaw for two terms: in 1793-94 and a second time in 1794-96.

References
  Encyklopedia Warszawy z 1994

Mayors of Warsaw
1736 births
1823 deaths
18th-century Polish–Lithuanian businesspeople
19th-century Polish businesspeople
Polish merchants
Polish bankers